Pierre Kazeye Rommel Kalulu Kyatengwa (born 5 June 2000) is a French professional footballer who plays as a defender for  club AC Milan. Mainly a right-back, he can also play in central defence.

Club career

Lyon 
Kalulu moved from his youth club Saint-Priest to the youth academy of Olympique Lyon in the summer of 2010. In Lyon, he passed through the different youth departments from 2010 to 2018, and was elevated to their reserve team in June 2018. For the home game against Amiens on 5 March 2020, Kalulu was called up for the first team of Lyon, but did not play in the match.

AC Milan 

In the summer of 2020, Kalulu moved to Italy to join AC Milan, and signed a contract until 2025. On 10 December, he made his professional debut, playing the entire Europa League game against Sparta Prague as a left-sided centre-back; as Milan won 1–0, he was praised for helping the team keep a clean sheet. Three days later, on 13 December, Kalulu made his debut in Serie A, replacing the injured Matteo Gabbia in the fifth minute of a home game against Parma. In the following away league game against Genoa played on 16 December, he made his first-ever start in Serie A and scored a debut goal in his senior career, equalizing the score in the eventual 2–2 draw.

During the 2021–22 season, after an injury to Alessio Romagnoli, Kalulu started the match against Napoli on 6 March 2022, partnering in central defence with Fikayo Tomori; he helped Milan to clinch a 1–0 win, impressing against Napoli's striker Victor Osimhen. On 12 March against Empoli, Kalulu scored his first goal of the season, a powerful curling shot from outside the box, as Milan managed to win 1–0 and stay top of the league. With him and Tomori again in central defence, Milan kept clean sheets in two consecutive Serie A games for the first time in 2022.

International career 
In addition to his French citizenship, Kalulu also holds the citizenship of the Democratic Republic of the Congo. Since June 2018, he has played through the various national junior teams of France, taking part in the 2019 UEFA European Under-19 Championship.

Personal life
Kalulu is the younger brother of footballers Aldo Kalulu and Gédéon Kalulu and is of Rwandan and Congolese descent.

Career statistics

Honours
AC Milan
Serie A: 2021–22

References

External links 

Profile at the AC Milan website
France profile at FFF

2000 births
Living people
Footballers from Lyon
French footballers
Association football defenders
Olympique Lyonnais players
A.C. Milan players
Championnat National 2 players
Serie A players
Footballers at the 2020 Summer Olympics
Olympic footballers of France
French expatriate footballers
Expatriate footballers in Italy
French expatriate sportspeople in Italy
Black French sportspeople
French sportspeople of Democratic Republic of the Congo descent